Fritz Ernst Bühlmann (22 March 1848 – 7 January 1936) was a Swiss politician and President of the Swiss National Council (1900/1901).

Works

External links 
 
 

Members of the National Council (Switzerland)
Presidents of the National Council (Switzerland)
1848 births
1936 deaths